Junellia is a genus of flowering plants in the verbena and vervain family Verbenaceae, native to the Andes, Patagonia, and the Falkland Islands.

Species
Currently accepted species include:

Junellia alba (Moldenke) Molinari
Junellia aretioides (R.E.Fr.) Moldenke
Junellia azorelloides (Speg.) Moldenkev
Junellia ballsii (Moldenke) N.O'Leary & P.Peralta
Junellia bisulcata (Hayek) Moldenke
Junellia bryoides (Phil.) Moldenke
Junellia caespitosa (Gillies & Hook.) Moldenke
Junellia clavata (Ruiz & Pav.) O'Leary & Múlgura
Junellia congesta (Tronc.) Moldenke
Junellia connatibracteata (Kuntze) Moldenke
Junellia coralloides M.Sheader & A.Sheader
Junellia crithmifolia (Gillies & Hook.) N.O'Leary & P.Peralta
Junellia digitata (Phil.) Moldenke
Junellia erinacea (Gillies & Hook.) Moldenke
Junellia fasciculata (Benth.) N.O'Leary & P.Peralta
Junellia hookeriana (Covas & Schnack) N.O'Leary & P.Peralta
Junellia juniperina (Lag.) Moldenke
Junellia lavandulifolia (Phil.) Moldenke
Junellia micrantha (Phil.) Moldenke
Junellia minima (Meyen) Moldenke
Junellia occulta (Moldenke) N.O'Leary & P.Peralta
Junellia odonellii Moldenke
Junellia origenes (Phil.) N.O'Leary & P.Peralta
Junellia pappigera (Phil.) N.O'Leary & P.Peralta
Junellia patagonica (Speg.) Moldenke
Junellia pseudojuncea (Gay) Moldenke
Junellia selaginoides (Kunth ex Walp.) Moldenke
Junellia seriphioides (Gillies & Hook.) Moldenke
Junellia silvestrii (Speg.) Moldenke
Junellia spathulata (Gillies & Hook.) Moldenke
Junellia spissa (Sandwith) Moldenke
Junellia succulentifolia (Kuntze) Moldenke
Junellia thymifolia (Lag.) Moldenke
Junellia toninii (Kuntze) Moldenke
Junellia tridactylites (Lag.) Moldenke
Junellia trifida (Kunth) P.Peralta & N.O'Leary
Junellia trifurcata (Phil.) Moldenke
Junellia tripartita Moldenke
Junellia ulicina (Phil.) Moldenke
Junellia uniflora (Phil.) Moldenke

References 

Verbenaceae
Verbenaceae genera